Father Jack may refer to the following fictional characters:

 Father Jack Hackett, a character in the television series Father Ted.
 Father Jack Mundy, a character in the Brian Friel play Dancing at Lughnasa